Wincenty Fryderyk de Lesseur, or Lesserowicz (1745, Warsaw - 31 May 1813, Warsaw) was a Polish painter, miniaturist, pastelist and caricaturist.

Biography
His father was a French army officer, stationed in Warsaw after the War of the Polish Succession. He received formal art education from Marcello and Johanna Bacciarelli. During a brief stay in Vienna, he worked with Heinrich Füger.

His primary patron (and customer) was King Stanisław August Poniatowski. After 1787, he served as a chamberlain at the court. By 1804, he was sufficiently well-off to settle on his own small property near Kozery.

He was renowned for his ability to create small watercolors or gouaches on ivory, using a pointillistic style that created the effect of smoothness.

In addition to portraits of the King, he painted portraits of other European monarchs, national heroes, artists, scholars, and aristocratic families and their friends. He also made miniature copies of the works of  Bacciarelli, Josef Grassi and Jan Chrzciciel Lampi.

A large collection of his miniatures which was owned by the Tarnowski family may now be seen at the Polish Museum, Rapperswil.

References

Further reading 
Halina Kamińska-Krassowska, Wincenty de Lesseur - życie i działalnośc (Life and Work)),  Muzeum Narodowe, 1969 Full Text online @ the Heidelberg University Library.

External links

1745 births
1813 deaths
18th-century Polish–Lithuanian painters
18th-century male artists
19th-century Polish painters
19th-century Polish male artists
Polish people of French descent
Artists from Warsaw
Polish portrait painters
Pastel artists
Polish male painters